"James Dean-esque" is a song by British indie rock band The Crocketts. Produced by Bird & Bush, "James Dean-esque" was featured on the 1999 Kerrang! compilation Super Summer Swinging Sounds and released as a single on 10 May 1999.

Reception
Reviewing the single, Kerrang! awarded "James Dean-esque" a rating of five out of five, describing the song as "Classy punk 'n' roll ... a simple tale of unrequited love ... delivered with a raised middle digit and the classic line 'I ain't gonna bother with her cos she ain't gonna do it with me'". The review also praised the B-sides, highlighting the "full throttle guitars and shuffling drums" on "Billy the Bunt" and describing "Rapid Pulsing Breaths" as "gentle and acoustic-sounding like The Pogues at their most depressed".

Track listing

Personnel
The Crocketts
Davey MacManus ("Davey Crockett") – vocals, guitar; production and mixing on tracks 2 and 3
Dan Harris ("Dan Boone") – guitar; production and mixing on tracks 2 and 3
Richard Carter ("Rich Wurzel") – bass; production and mixing on tracks 2 and 3
Owen Hopkin ("Owen Cash") – drums; production and mixing on tracks 2 and 3
Additional personnel
Bird & Bush – production on track 1
Dave Murder – production on tracks 2 and 3

References

1999 singles
The Crocketts songs
1999 songs